The Canadian Digital Downloads Chart, also known by the name of Hot Canadian Digital Songs in the Billboard magazine, ranks the best selling music downloads in Canada. The data are compiled by Nielsen SoundScan based on each single's weekly digital sales, which combines sales of different versions of a single for a summarized figure. The chart is published every Thursday by CANOE.

Chart history

See also
2010 in music
List of number-one singles (Canada)
List of Canadian number-one albums of 2010
List of number-one digital songs of 2011 (Canada)

References

Canada downloads
Digital 2010
2010 in Canadian music